Christina Messineo Annunziata is an American medical oncologist researching molecular signal transduction in ovarian cancer. She is an investigator in the National Cancer Institute's women's malignancies branch and head of the translational genomics section.

Education 
Annunziata is a graduate of Georgetown University Medical School where she also completed graduate school and residency training in internal medicine. Her dissertation was titled CD40 signaling Hodgkin's disease.

She came to the National Cancer Institute (NCI) as a postdoctoral researcher for medical oncology training in the medical oncology branch. Annunziata joined the NCI laboratory of Louis M. Staudt in the metabolism branch to investigate NF-kappaB signaling in multiple myeloma. She returned to the medical oncology branch to extend her study of these molecular pathways in the ovarian cancer model. She researched in the clinic of Elise C. Kohn.

Career and research 
Annunziata maintains her clinical focus in the translational clinical studies of ovarian cancer. She is an investigator and head of the NCI translational genomics section. She directs clinical operations for the women's malignancies branch. Annunziata holds board certification for the practice of medical oncology. Annunziata is a participating member in the Gynecologic Oncology Group, the American Association for Cancer Research, the American Society for Clinical Oncology, and the Society of Gynecologic Oncology. She serves as course director for the Women's Malignancies Lecture Series in the Women's Malignancies Branch, and Associate Editor for the international journal, BMC Cancer.

References

External links 

 
 

Living people
Year of birth missing (living people)
Place of birth missing (living people)
Georgetown University School of Medicine alumni
National Institutes of Health people
American oncologists
Women oncologists
21st-century American women scientists
21st-century American women physicians
21st-century American physicians
American medical researchers
Women medical researchers
American women biologists
21st-century American biologists